Possumhaw is a common name for several plants and may refer to:

 Ilex decidua
 Ilex verticillata
 Viburnum nudum